The Netherlands Football League Championship 1954–1955 was contested by 56 teams participating in four divisions. The national champion would be determined by a play-off featuring the winners of each division of the Netherlands. Willem II won this year's championship by beating NAC, PSV Eindhoven and FC Eindhoven.

This season saw the introduction of professional football in the Netherlands. Initially two competitions began after the summer break: one from the NBVB and one from the KNVB. In November, the NBVB merged into the KNVB and one unified league commenced.

At the end of the season, the four Eerste Klasse Divisions were re-aligned as two Divisions called Hoofdklasse A & B.

New entrants
48 competitors from last season participated, only in completely other divisions. Last years competitors Bleijerheide merged to form Roda Sport and Juliana merged to form Rapid JC. New entrants were:
Alkmaar '54
BVC Amsterdam
Fortuna
DFC
De Graafschap
Holland Sport
HVC
Veendam

Divisions

Eerste Klasse A

Table

Results

Eerste Klasse B

Table

Results

Eerste Klasse C

Table

Results

Eerste Klasse D

Table

Results

Championship play-off

References
Netherlands professional football season '54/55

Netherlands Football League Championship seasons
1954–55 in Dutch football
Neth